There are over 20,000 Grade II* listed buildings in England. This page is a list of these buildings in the district of South Kesteven in Lincolnshire.

South Kesteven

|}

Notes

External links

Lists of Grade II* listed buildings in Lincolnshire
 
South Kesteven District